Hospital dos Marmeleiros is a hospital in Monte (Funchal), Madeira.

History
On 23 July 1905, the Paris edition of the New York Herald carried a report headed: "German Company Plans to Make Madeira an up-to-date Resort". In return for a promise to build a sanatorium and hospitals and treat 40 tuberculosis patients a year free, the Madeira Aktiengesellschaft, headed by Prince Friedrich Karl Hohenlohe-Öhringen, was in an arrangement with the Portuguese government, that in turn for building these facilities it will take over all business concerns on Madeira. When plans for some of the hospitals were exposed as being designs for hotels and holiday camps, the Madeirans realized that they were being colonized through the back door and promptly withdrew the concession. Just before this the Germans were constructing what is today the Hospital dos Marmeleiros (the only building the Germans began to build), the Germans were given a tax break and did not need to pay tax on anything needed to construct the hospital. The site was left abandoned until 1930 when the Madeirans continued to build the Hospital dos Marmeleiros.

Locals say that the reason that the hospital construction was abandoned by the Germans was not just because of their colonization plans being discovered. It was that during the construction of the hospital the Germans needed special materials not available on Madeira, so it was agreed that Madeirans would take the materials up to the site from the German ship in the harbour. The strongest horses were used to bring up the wooden barrels. The local Madeiran with the strongest horses bringing up the materials was suspicious that what he was taking up the hill was heavier than what should be needed to construct the hospital, so he on purpose let one of the barrels roll down the hill and smash open. It is alleged that it was filled with rifles. When the locals looked inside what was already constructed they found ammunition and more guns. This caused the Madeirans to confiscate all German property in Madeira and stop the construction of the hospital.

On November 1930, the building was completed and the first patients were transferred there, making it one of the first hospitals in the country. The inauguration of the new facilities took place on August 10, 1940.

References

Hospitals in Madeira
Hospital buildings completed in 1930